The Lima Tuberculosis Hospital was a tuberculosis sanatorium built in 1911 to deal with the leading causes of death in the United States in the early twentieth century.

History

Establishment 

From establishment in 1911 it held 24 beds originally, and was remodeled in 1927 to hold 158 beds. 

The capacity changed to 138 patients after an additional remodel occurred in 1957.

The hospital was renamed Ottawa Valley Tuberculosis Hospital in 1960. By 1970 it was nearly empty. In 1972 use of the second floor was shuttered and the entire hospital closed its doors in 1973.

Abandonment 
While the hospital was winding down operation, on January 10, 1972, it was agreed that the hospital would be transferred to the Allen County Board of Commissioners.

Because of its relatively remote location and the use of hard to clean up substances such as asbestos in the construction of the original 1911 building, the city of Lima did not prioritize demolition of the building.

It is rumored to be haunted, but one urban explorer attributes the noises to the nearby Lima Refinery.

Around Halloween of 2020 a large surge of trespassing at the site occurred, which lead to an increased police presence and crackdown on trespassers.

References

External links
 Youtube: Abandoned Tuberculosis Hospital - Lima, Ohio
Tuberculosis sanatoria in the United States
Unused buildings in Ohio
Defunct hospitals in Ohio
Reportedly haunted locations in Ohio